The 2021 Major League Baseball First-Year Player Draft took place on July 11–13, 2021. In conjunction with the 2021 Major League Baseball All-Star Game, the draft was held in Denver. The draft assigned amateur baseball players to MLB teams. The draft order was set based on the reverse order of the 2020 MLB season standings. In addition, compensation picks were distributed for players who did not sign from the 2020 MLB Draft and for teams who lost qualifying free agents. On March 26, 2020, MLB and the MLBPA reached a deal that included the option to halve the draft to 20 rounds due to the COVID-19 pandemic. MLB ultimately opted to shorten the draft to 20 rounds. In total, 612 college and high school players were drafted.

The Pittsburgh Pirates, who had the worst record of the 2020 season, selected Henry Davis with the first overall pick in the draft. As punishment for their role in the sign stealing scandal, the Houston Astros forfeited both their first- and second-round picks in the draft.

On April 2, 2021, MLB announced that the 2021 MLB All-Star Game, along with the draft, was being relocated from Atlanta in protest of the Georgia State Legislature's passage of the controversial Election Integrity Act of 2021; three days later, Denver was announced as the new host city.

Chase Silseth made his MLB debut on May 13, 2022, making him the first player from the 2021 draft to make his major league debut.

Draft selections
The deadline for teams to sign drafted players was August 1, 2021.

First round

Compensatory round

Competitive Balance Round A

Second round

Competitive Balance Round B

Other notable selections

Notes

Compensation picks

References

Major League Baseball draft
Draft
Major League Baseball draft
2020s in Denver
Major League Baseball draft
Baseball in Colorado
Events in Denver
Sports in Denver